José Joaquín Álvarez de Toledo y Silva, 18th Duke of Medina Sidonia, GE (Madrid, Spain; 14 August 1826 – 15 February 1900) was a Spanish aristocrat and politician who served as Superior Chief of the Palace from 1885 until his death. He was a knight of the Real Maestranza de Caballería de Sevilla and of the Order of Alcántara.

Background
The Duke was the elder son of Pedro de Alcántara Álvarez de Toledo, 13th Marquis of Villafranca and María del Pilar Joaquina de Silva, fifth daughter of José Gabriel de Silva, 10th Marquis of Santa Cruz and Joaquina Téllez-Girón y Pimentel, daughter of Pedro Téllez-Girón, 9th Duke of Osuna and María Josefa Pimentel, 14th Countess Duchess of Benavente. He was educated at the Theresian Military Academy, in Austro-Hungary, where his father was exiled for being a carlist sympathiser.

Politics
In 1847, Queen Isabella II lifted the seizure of the properties of the Medina Sidonias in Spain, and the family was able to return. The young Pepe, by then Marquis of los Vélez, started his political career, taking a seat in 1852 at the Parliament of the Two Sicilies, as Prince of Paternò. He succeeded in the dukedom in 1862, and following the Restoration of the monarchy in 1874, became senator in his own right in 1875 and for the province of Cádiz in 1876.

From 1885, he served as Superior Chief of Palace with King Alfonso XIII, and was part of the extraordinary embassy, headed by the Duke of Montpensier, sent to Russia in 1883 to represent Spain at the coronation of Tsar Alexander III. He received numerous honours and decorations, including the Golden Fleece, the Collar of the Order of Charles III and the Grand Cross of the Order of the Immaculate Conception of Vila Viçosa.

Marriage
Medina Sidonia married his first cousin Rosalía Caro y Álvarez de Toledo, daughter of Pedro Caro, 4th Marquis of la Romana and granddaughter of Pedro Caro, 3rd Marquis of la Romana, in Erpel, Austro-Hungary, the 26 September 1846. They had four children.

Issue

Doña María del Socorro Álvarez de Toledo (1847–1929), married Don José Maria Ortuño de Ezpeleta, 4th Duke of Castroterreño and had issue.
Don Alonso Álvarez de Toledo, 15th Marquis of los Vélez (1850–1897), married Doña María Trinidad Caballero, daughter of Andrés Caballero, 1st Marquis of Somosancho. Died before succeeding his father and without issue.
Doña Inés Álvarez de Toledo, 16th Marquise of Cazaza en África (1857–1937), married Don Fernando Ramírez de Haro, 13th Count of Bornos, and had issue.
Don José Joaquín Álvarez de Toledo, 19th Duke of Medina Sidonia, who succeeded in the titles of his father.

Titles

Spain
18th Duke of Medina Sidonia
14th Marquess of Villafranca del Bierzo
14th Marquess of Vélez

Two Sicilies
15th Duke of Montalto
12th Duke of Fernandina
11th Prince of Montalbán 
15th Count of Caltavuturo
Count of Collesano
Count of Adernò
Lord of Petralia Sottana y Soprana

Ancestry

References
 Geneall.net
 Personal dossier of The Duke of Medina Sidonia. Spanish Senate
 Mateos Sáinz de Medrano, Ricardo, Nobleza Obliga, La Esfera de los Libros, Madrid, 2006, 

|-

|-

|-

|-

118
112
Marquesses of Molina
Counts of Spain
Knights of the Golden Fleece of Spain
Knights Grand Cross of the Order of the Immaculate Conception of Vila Viçosa
Grandees of Spain
1826 births
1900 deaths
Jose Joaquin